Rhoiacarpos is a genus of flowering plants belonging to the family Santalaceae.

Its native range is Southern Africa.

Species:
 Rhoiacarpos capensis (Harv.) A.DC.

References

Santalaceae
Santalales genera